The Tesla Megapack is large-scale rechargeable lithium-ion battery stationary energy storage product, intended for use at battery storage power stations, manufactured by Tesla Energy, the clean energy subsidiary of Tesla, Inc.

Launched in 2019, each Megapack can store up to 3.9 megawatt-hours (MWh) of electricity. Each Megapack is a container that is sized slightly under the size of the ISO intermodal container. Designed to be deployed by utility companies, Megapacks can be used to store energy generated by intermittent renewable power sources, such as solar and wind. The energy stored can be used by the grid as required, for example during periods of peak electricity demand.

Tesla Energy also offers smaller battery energy storage devices: the Powerwall, intended for home use, and the Powerpack, intended for use by businesses or on smaller power utility projects.

History 

On April 30, 2015, Tesla announced that it would begin to sell standalone battery storage products to consumers and utility companies. Tesla CEO Elon Musk stated that the company's battery storage products could be used to improve the reliability of intermittent renewable energy sources, such as solar and wind.

Prior to the launch of the Megapack, Tesla used its 200 kilowatt-hour (kWh) Powerpack energy storage product to meet the needs of utility companies with large-scale storage requirements. During 2015 and 2016, Tesla deployed a combined 300 MWh of Powerwall and Powerpack technology, including an 80 MWh deployment of Powerpacks at the Mira Loma substation in Southern California. In 2017, Tesla used Powerpacks to deploy 129 MWh of battery storage at the Hornsdale Power Reserve in South Australia. At the time, this was the biggest deployment of lithium-ion grid battery storage in the world.

Work began on the Megapack project at least as early as the first half of 2018. The Megapack was designed at Giga Nevada.

In July 2019, the Megapack was officially launched.

The Megapack was described by Tesla as a utility-scale energy storage product, suitable for power stations and utility companies. Tesla claimed that Megapacks would be compatible with Tesla power station monitoring and energy control software, Powerhub and Autobidder. The company also stated that the Megapack was designed to meet the needs of large-scale battery storage projects, similar to the Hornsdale Power Reserve.

Tesla acquired a former JC Penney's distribution center in Lathrop, California, in 2021 for a new battery plant called the Megafactory, with a target capacity of 40 GWh/year when finished. The next-generation Megapacks is planned to use prismatic lithium iron phosphate batteries.

Specifications 

Megapacks are currently manufactured at Giga Nevada. Tesla has stated that it is investing in expanding the factory in order to increase Megapack, Model 3, and Model Y output efficiency.

Megapacks are sold by Tesla's worldwide network of internal sales representatives and external partners.

Each Megapack comes with a 15-year "no defect" and "energy retention" warranty, according to Tesla. A 10 or 20 year "performance guarantee" is also available for an additional cost. Once a Megapack has reached the end of its useful life, Tesla says they can be returned to be recycled.

Tesla states that it supplies Megapacks ready-assembled, including "battery modules, bi-directional inverters, a thermal management system, an AC main breaker and controls."

The Megapack thermal management system is located at the top of each unit. It uses coolant fluid, made of an equal-parts mixture of ethylene glycol and water, to keep the battery at operating temperature.

Maintenance must be performed on each Megapack once annually and once every ten years. The annual maintenance includes torque and calibration checks, inspections, cleaning, paint touchup, ventilation and coolant checks, and battery communications checks. The ten-year maintenance is required to perform activities such as replacing the pump that powers the thermal management system, replacing the door gasket, and refilling the coolant fluid. Maintenance is expected to take about an hour per Megapack.

Market and use cases 
Megapacks are designed to be used for large-scale energy storage. Tesla has stated that Megapacks could be used by utility companies to replace peaker power plants, which generate extra energy during periods of peak demand. Megapacks are designed to store energy that can be later used during periods of surplus demand, rather than a peaker power plant having to generate the energy in real-time using coal or natural gas. It has been shown that grid battery storage can help to reduce power plant carbon dioxide emissions and unit costs of energy production.

Tesla Powerpacks continue to be used by utility companies to meet smaller-scale grid energy storage requirements. For example, a 25 MW / 52 MWh deployment of Powerpacks began testing in November 2019 at the Lake Bonney Wind Farm in South Australia.

Large-scale battery storage solutions such as the Megapack are becoming more economically viable for utility companies to implement due to the declining price of lithium-ion battery technology. Demand for energy storage is also increasing in some jurisdictions due to transitions towards renewable energy sources. Because solar and wind energy sources are more intermittent than coal or natural gas or nuclear power, the electrical energy can be stored in order to fulfill peak-period demand.

Other energy storage solutions, such as pumped hydroelectric storage, continue to dominate the market. As of 2019, pumped hydroelectric storage accounted for 96% of global energy storage capacity. Pumped hydroelectric storage systems have relatively long lifetimes when compared to battery storage.

Battery storage solutions such as the Megapack can be used in situations where a fast deployment is required, because pumped hydro projects normally take longer to complete when compared to batteries. Tesla has previously used fast deployment as a selling point of its utility-scale battery storage products.

Deployments

Completed deployments 
In November 2019, Tesla used a Megapack to power a mobile Supercharger - a recharging station for Tesla electric vehicles - in California. The mobile Supercharger was reported to deliver 125 kW, and was transported on a flat trailer attached to a truck in between deployment locations.

In December 2019, Tesla delivered a 1.25 MW / 2.5 MWh Megapack to the Millidgeville Substation in Saint John, Canada. Saint John Energy, the owner of the Megapack, stated that it will be used for peak shaving. The battery is estimated to save Saint John Energy CA$200,000 per year. Saint John Energy planned to integrate the battery to work with its grid management software.  It became operational on April 3, 2020, and is being used for peak-shaving.

In July 2021, at the 300 MW Victorian Big Battery (377 to 450 MWh energy, depending on power draw) near Geelong and constituting the largest battery in the southern hemisphere, one of the 212 modules of Tesla Megapack caught fire due to a coolant leak while the battery was unmonitored, and set fire to the adjacent Megapack. Three days later, the fire had burnt itself out, and the commissioning process resumed in late September, while lessons were applied to other batteries. The battery was commissioned on time in December 2021, a year after contract, with an estimated ROI of 2.4.

Planned deployments 

In May 2020, Strata Solar, an American commercial solar services provider, announced that they would engage Tesla as the battery provider for a 100 MW / 400 MWh energy storage facility in Ventura County, California. The Megapack deployment will replace a natural-gas powered peaker power plant, and will take up three acres of space near the Ventura County Juvenile Justice Center. The project was scheduled to begin in July 2020, with completion expected by January 2021.

Moss Landing project 

Utilities in California are required by a 2013 law to provide significant battery storage by 2024. In June 2018, Pacific Gas and Electric Company (PG&E) requested approval from the California Public Utilities Commission to engage Tesla to deploy a battery storage system at the Moss Landing Power Plant, in Monterey County. The system is capable of producing 182.5 MW for four hours, for a total of 730 MWh of capacity. It became one of the world's largest utility-owned battery storage installations.

The project is designed to improve energy reliability and to allow for more renewable energy sources to be used at the Moss Landing site. The project also aims to save costs by reducing PG&E's reliance on peaker power plants that come online during periods of increased demand. Tesla later confirmed that it would use Megapacks to complete the project.

On July 3, 2019, in accordance with the California Environmental Quality Act, the County of Monterey Resource Management Agency published a Mitigated Negative Declaration, detailing actions that must be taken to mitigate potential environmental impacts of the project. The report concluded that the project would have a "Less than Significant Impact" on the environment, assuming the correct mitigating actions were taken. Specifically, it was found that mitigating actions were required to minimize the environmental impact of the project on "biological resources" such as wildlife habitat, and on "cultural resources", especially culturally-significant archaeological sites at the proposed location of the Megapack deployment.

The project was subsequently opened to public submissions on its environmental impact. On February 26, 2020, the Monterey County Planning Commission unanimously approved the project, giving PG&E and Tesla permission to proceed with the Megapack deployment.

In April 2022, Tesla and PG&E completed and commissioned the Elkhorn Battery. Following the completion of final tests, the BESS was fully energised and certified by the California Independent System Operator (CAISO) on April 7. The final build features 256 Megapacks manufactured in Lathrop, and set on 33 concrete slabs, as well as transformers and switchgears to connect the batteries to the 115kv electric transmission system. On September 20, a module caught fire, which was under control by evening.

References

External links
 

Megapack
Grid energy storage
Lithium-ion batteries
Products introduced in 2019
2019 in technology